Scolosanthus is a genus of flowering plants in the coffee family, Rubiaceae.

Species include:
Scolosanthus acanthodes
Scolosanthus acunae
Scolosanthus bahamensis
Scolosanthus crucifer
Scolosanthus ekmanii
Scolosanthus grandifolius – espuela de galan
 Scolosanthus howardii Borhidi
Scolosanthus leonardii
Scolosanthus liogieri
Scolosanthus lucidus
Scolosanthus maestrensis
Scolosanthus moanus
Scolosanthus multiflorus
Scolosanthus portoricensis – maricao	
Scolosanthus selleanus
Scolosanthus strictus
Scolosanthus subsessilis
Scolosanthus triacanthus
Scolosanthus versicolor – Puerto Rico devilbrush
Scolosanthus wrightianus

References

 
Rubiaceae genera
Taxonomy articles created by Polbot